June 9 - Eastern Orthodox Church calendar - June 11

All fixed commemorations below celebrated on June 23 by Orthodox Churches on the Old Calendar.

For June 10th, Orthodox Churches on the Old Calendar commemorate the Saints listed on May 28.

Saints
 Martyrs Alexander and Antonina, at Crodamon (c. 313)
 Martyr Neaniscus the Wise of Alexandria.
 Hieromartyr Timothy of Prussa, Bishop of Prusa  (c. 361-363)
 Martyr Zacharias, in Nicomedia.
 Venerables Theophanes, monk, and Pansemne, former harlot, of Antioch (369)
 Saint Asterius, Bishop of Petra (4th century)
 Venerable Canides, monk, of Cappadocia (c. 460)
 Saint Alexius of Bithynia, Bishop of Bithynia.
 Venerable Apollo, Bishop, reposed in peace.

Pre-Schism Western saints
 Saints Crispulus and Restitutus, martyrs under Nero, either in Rome or else in Spain (1st century)
 Martyrs Getulius, Caerealis, Amantius and Primitivus, in Tivoli in Italy under Hadrian (c. 120)
 Saints Basilides, Tripos, Mandal and Companions, a group of twenty-three Orthodox martyred in Rome on the Aurelian Way under Aurelian (c. 270-275)
 Saint Maximus of Naples, tenth Bishop of Naples in Italy (361)
 Saint Bassianus of Lodi, Bishop of Lodi in Lombardy (409)
 Saints Aresius, Rogatius and Companions, a group of seventeen martyrs in North Africa.
 Saint Olivia of Palermo, a virgin-martyr venerated in Palermo in Sicily and in Carthage in North Africa (463)
 Saint Censurius, the successor of St Germanus as Bishop of Auxerre in France (486)
 Saint Illadan (Illathan, Iolladhan), Bishop of Rathlihen in Offaly in Ireland (6th century)
 Saint Ithamar, Bishop of Rochester in England (656)
 Saint Landericus of Paris (Landry of Paris), Bishop of Paris in France (661)
 Venerable Evermund (Evermond, Ebremund), monastic founder, monk and abbot (c. 720)
 Saint Maurinus of Cologne, probably Abbot of St Pantaleon in Cologne in Germany, where he was martyred.
 Saint Landericus (Landry), a monk at Novalese Abbey in Savoy in Italy, drowned in the River Arc by evildoers (c. 1050)
 Saint Bardo, Abbot of Werden Abbey on the Ruhr, then Abbot of Hersfeld Abbey, also Archbishop of Mainz (1053)

Post-Schism Orthodox saints
 Venerable Silouan (Silvanus) of the Far Caves in Kiev (13th-14th centuries)
 Blessed Cosmas, Fool-for-Christ, of Verkhoturye (1706)
 Saint John Maximovitch of Tobolsk, Metropolitan of Tobolsk and all Siberia (1715)
 Venerable new martyr Savvas of Stagira (Savvas Stageiritis) (1821)

New martyrs and confessors
 New Hieromartyrs Nicholas, and Basil Pobedonostsev, Priests (1918)
 Martyr Paul (1918)
 Venerable-Confessor Schema-Abbess Fomar (Mardzhanova), a Georgian abbess who had also labored in Russia (1936)
 New Hieromartyr Timothy Ulyanov, Priest (1940)

Other commemorations
 Uncovering and translation (1609) of the relics of St. Basil, Bishop of Ryazan (1295)
 Synaxis of the Saints of Ryazan.
 Synaxis of the Saints of Siberia.
 Repose of Elder Nahum of Solovki Monastery (1853)
 Repose of Schema-monk Sergius of Valaam Monastery (1860)
 Repose of Schema-abbess Tamar (Mardzhanishvili) of the St. Seraphim–Znamensky Skete (1936)

Icon gallery

Notes

References

Sources
 June 10/23. Orthodox Calendar (PRAVOSLAVIE.RU).
 June 23 / June 10. HOLY TRINITY RUSSIAN ORTHODOX CHURCH (A parish of the Patriarchate of Moscow).
 June 10. OCA - The Lives of the Saints.
 The Autonomous Orthodox Metropolia of Western Europe and the Americas (ROCOR). St. Hilarion Calendar of Saints for the year of our Lord 2004. St. Hilarion Press (Austin, TX). p. 43.
 The Tenth Day of the Month of June. Orthodoxy in China.
 June 10. Latin Saints of the Orthodox Patriarchate of Rome.
 The Roman Martyrology. Transl. by the Archbishop of Baltimore. Last Edition, According to the Copy Printed at Rome in 1914. Revised Edition, with the Imprimatur of His Eminence Cardinal Gibbons. Baltimore: John Murphy Company, 1916. pp. 168–169.
 Rev. Richard Stanton. A Menology of England and Wales, or, Brief Memorials of the Ancient British and English Saints Arranged According to the Calendar, Together with the Martyrs of the 16th and 17th Centuries. London: Burns & Oates, 1892. pp. 264–265.
Greek Sources
 Great Synaxaristes:  10 ΙΟΥΝΙΟΥ. ΜΕΓΑΣ ΣΥΝΑΞΑΡΙΣΤΗΣ.
  Συναξαριστής. 10 Ιουνίου. ECCLESIA.GR. (H ΕΚΚΛΗΣΙΑ ΤΗΣ ΕΛΛΑΔΟΣ). 
  10/06/2017. Ορθόδοξος Συναξαριστής. 
Russian Sources
  23 июня (10 июня). Православная Энциклопедия под редакцией Патриарха Московского и всея Руси Кирилла (электронная версия). (Orthodox Encyclopedia - Pravenc.ru).
  10 июня по старому стилю / 23 июня по новому стилю. Русская Православная Церковь - Православный церковный календарь на 2017 год.
  10 июня (ст.ст.) 23 июня 2014 (нов. ст.). Русская Православная Церковь Отдел внешних церковных связей. (DECR).

June in the Eastern Orthodox calendar